Distichium is a genus of haplolepideous mosses (Dicranidae) in the monotypic family Distichiaceae.

Taxonomy

The genus Distichium has traditionally been considered part of family Ditrichaceae. However, phylogenetic analyses have found Ditrichaceae to be polyphyletic and Distichium part of a protohaplolepidous grade of early branching lineages in Dicranidae. 
Based on these studies Distichium was restored to Distichiaceae, where it was originally placed by Schimper (1860).

Species

The genus contains the following species:

Distichium asperrimum 
Distichium austroinclinatum 
Distichium brachyphyllum 
Distichium brachystegium 
Distichium brevifolium 
Distichium brevisetum 
Distichium bryoxiphioidium 
Distichium capillaceum 
Distichium crispatum 
Distichium hagenii 
Distichium inclinatum 
Distichium lorentzii 
Distichium remotifolium 
Distichium setifolium 
Distichium strictifolium 
Distichium vernicosum

References

Moss genera
Bryopsida